Johnson Stadium may refer to
J. L. Johnson Stadium, baseball venue in Tulsa, Oklahoma, home to the Oral Roberts Golden Eagles
Charlie W. Johnson Stadium, Columbia, South Carolina, primarily used for American football, and the home field of Benedict College 
Johnson Stadium at Doubleday Field, baseball venue on the campus of the United States Military Academy, in West Point, New York
Johnson Hagood Stadium, football stadium in Charleston, South Carolina, the home field of The Citadel Bulldogs
Grace P. Johnson Stadium, at Lumbee Guaranty Bank Field, is a college football stadium in Pembroke, North Carolina.